Sarah Maitland may refer to:

Sara Maitland, misspelling
Sarah Maitland, character in The Outsider (King novel)